The Cannonball Adderley Quintet in San Francisco is a 1959 album by The Cannonball Adderley Quintet.

The groundbreaking album launched "soul jazz", according to NPR, bridging "the gap between bebop and funk". Originally released by Riverside Records, the album has been reissued on CD several times since 1991 by Riverside and OJC. Remastered versions of the album include extended cuts of several of the songs on the original, including the retitled "(A Few Words by Cannonball...And) This Here".

Background 
The album was recorded at The Jazz Workshop in San Francisco before an appreciative standing-room only crowd. The album broke new ground as a live recording taped in noisy club environments, creating a formula that not only the Cannonball Quintet but other jazz ensembles would follow. Producer Orrin Keepnews reflected that it "was such a phenomenal success that not only did I do a lot of such recordings afterwards, but I think that virtually all jazz producers felt that it was a good thing to do". Also unusual for the time was Keepnews' decision to retain Adderley's comments to the crowd.

Reception
Producer and jazz critic Orrin Keepnews described the album as "the birth of contemporary live recording" and in May 1960, Time noted that the album's then 50,000 copies sold was "phenomenal for a jazz record", raising the album to the bestseller charts. Music critic Scott Yanow describes the album as a "gem [...] essential for all jazz collections." The Penguin Guide to Jazz awarded the album 3 stars, stating: "In San Francisco is a little overstretched, with four tracks nudging the 12-minute mark and some of the solos running out of steam too soon".

Track listing 
 "This Here" (Bobby Timmons) – 12:29
 "Spontaneous Combustion" (Cannonball Adderley) – 11:55
 "Hi-Fly" (Randy Weston) – 11:09
 "You Got It!" (Cannonball Adderley) – 5:10
 "Bohemia After Dark" (Oscar Pettiford) – 8:06
 "Straight, No Chaser" (Thelonious Monk) – 11:43 (2000 Bonus Track; 2007 Bonus Track)
 "This Here [Alternate Take]"– 11:40 (2007 Bonus Track)
 "You Got It! [Alternate Take]" – 6:11 (2007 Bonus Track)

Personnel 
 Cannonball Adderley – alto saxophone
 Nat Adderley – cornet
 Bobby Timmons – piano
 Sam Jones – bass
 Louis Hayes – drums

Technical personnel
 Reice Hamel – engineer
 Orrin Keepnews – producer
 Ralph J. Gleason – liner notes
 Paul Bacon – design
 Ken Braren – design
 Harris Lewine – design
 Kirk Felton – digital remastering

References 

Albums produced by Orrin Keepnews
Albums with cover art by Paul Bacon
Grammy Hall of Fame Award recipients
1959 live albums
Cannonball Adderley live albums
Riverside Records live albums
1959 in California
Albums recorded at the Jazz Workshop